Merle Fräbel (born 11 June 2003) is a German luger. She is the Under-23 World Champion, and Winter Youth Olympics champion in luge singles discipline.

Career

Junior and youth career
Merle Fräbel started her luge career at the age of eight. At the Youth Olympic Games in Lausanne 2020, she celebrated her greatest success in the youth and junior division with a gold medal in the singles and silver in the team relay. She was the first German female luger to win a gold medal at the Youth Olympic Games. In the following season, 2021/22, she won the overall World Cup in both the singles and the team in the Junior World Cup. She won the bronze medal at the 2022 Junior World Championships in Winterberg.

Senior career
Merle Fräbel started her Luge World Cup debut races in the 2022/23 season after good results in the German qualifying races, in which she won three of the four races. At the 2023 Luge World Championships on her home track in Oberhof, she took fourth place in the sprint. In the singles she was fifth and at the same time she secured the U23 World Championship's gold medal.

Luge results
All results are sourced from the International Luge Federation (FIL) and German Bobsleigh, Luge and Skeleton Federation (BSD).

World Cup

U23 World Championships
 2023 Oberhof –  in Singles

Junior World Championships
 2022 Winterberg -  in Singles

Junior European Championships
 2023 Sigulda -  in Singles

References

External links

Merle Fräbel at the German Bobsleigh, Luge and Skeleton Federation

 
2003 births
Living people
German female lugers